Bunce is a surname. Notable people with the surname include:

Alan Bunce, Canadian animator
Che Bunce, New Zealand (All White) soccer player
David Bunce, music producer
Don Bunce (1949–2003), American quarterback
Elizabeth C. Bunce, American author
Emma Bunce (born 1975), British astrophysicist
Francis M. Bunce (1836–1901), United States Rear Admiral and civil war veteran
Frank Bunce, New Zealand (All Black Rugby union player
Fred Bunce, American professional baseball umpire
H. C. Bunce, American professional baseball umpire
James Bunce (disambiguation)
 Sir James Bunce, 1st Baronet Bunce (c. 1600–1670)
 Sir James Bunce, 4th Baronet Bunce (died c. 1710)
 Sir James Bunce, 6th Baronet Bunce (died 1741)
 John Patrick Bunce, reality TV star on the show Bering Sea Gold (1985–2012)
 Sir John Bunce, 2nd Baronet Bunce (1630–1683)
 Sir John Bunce, 3rd Baronet Bunce (c. 1659–1687)
 Sir John Bunce, 5th Baronet Bunce (died c. 1720)
 Susan Bunce, British Housing Benefits Expert
Joseph H. Bunce, Mayor of Louisville, Kentucky, USA
Josh Bunce (1847–1912), left fielder and umpire
John Thackray Bunce (1828–1899), English newspaper editor and author, father of Kate Bunce
Kate Elizabeth Bunce (1856–1927), English poet and painter, daughter of John Thackray Bunce
Larry Bunce, basketball player
Leela Bunce, radio personality
Mike Bunce, rugby player
Oliver Bell Bunce (1828–1890), American author, editor, and playwright
Paddy Bunce, sports radio reporter
Pips Bunce, British banking executive 
Steve Bunce, British sports journalist specialising in boxing
Stuart Bunce, English actor
Vikki Bunce, field hockey player
William Bunce, English footballer
William Bunce (cricketer) (1911–1981)
Zephaniah W. Bunce, American businessman and politician
Chauncey Bunce Brewster (1848–1941) bishop

Pseudonyms
Henry Shapcott Bunce, penname of Shapcott Wensley

See also
 Bunce baronets
 Bunce (disambiguation)